Blake Wagner (born January 29, 1988) is an American soccer coach for Tampa Bay United SC and was a former player who most recently played for the Carolina RailHawks in the North American Soccer League.

Career

Youth
Wagner was identified by U.S. Soccer (U.S. National Team) when he was 13 through their national Olympic Development Program (ODP). He joined the U-14 National Team and was then recruited to their U-15 residency program at the IMG Academy in Bradenton, Florida, where he lived and trained. Through U.S. Soccer, he completed high school a year early at the Edison Academy. Wagner travelled globally with the team and was a starter with the U-17 National team when they played in the 2005 FIFA U-17 World Championship.

Wagner at first committed to playing college soccer at the University of Maryland, College Park, but instead chose to join the Generation Adidas program so that he could play professional soccer.

Professional
Wagner was drafted in the second round, 18th overall, of the 2006 MLS SuperDraft by FC Dallas. Wagner made his first appearance with FCD's first team on July 19, 2006 as a substitute in a 2-0 friendly match win against UANL Tigres. It would be his only appearance with the first team during his rookie season. In 2007, Blake made his MLS career debut on September 30, 2007 starting in a 0-3 loss against Houston Dynamo. He would make 12 appearances with the team during the 2007 MLS Season. The 2008 MLS Season was a breakout year for the third-year defender. Blake started in 23 of 24 games played and appeared in four of FC Dallas' six international friendlies.

On February 2, 2010 Vancouver Whitecaps announced the signing of Wagner after he did not re-sign with Dallas. He played his first match with the second division side on July 14, 2010 and played as a left wing midfielder and netted a hat trick in a 3-1 win over Miami FC.

After a successful 2011 preseason trial, Wagner signed with the Major League Soccer version of Vancouver Whitecaps FC on March 11, 2011. The Whitecaps released Wagner on July 28, 2011.

On August 16, 2011 Wagner was signed by Major League Soccer club Real Salt Lake. At season's end, the club declined his 2012 contract option and he entered the 2011 MLS Re-Entry Draft. Wagner was not selected in the draft and became a free agent.

Wagner signed with NASL club San Antonio Scorpions in March, 2012.

Managerial career

In 2017 he became an assistant coach with Tampa Bay's U23 team. Currently a staff coach with Tampa Bay United.

References

External links
 Carolina RailHawks profile
 

1988 births
Living people
American soccer players
American expatriate soccer players
FC Dallas players
Vancouver Whitecaps (1986–2010) players
Vancouver Whitecaps FC players
Vancouver Whitecaps FC U-23 players
Real Salt Lake players
San Antonio Scorpions players
Tampa Bay Rowdies players
North Carolina FC players
Expatriate soccer players in Canada
Major League Soccer players
USSF Division 2 Professional League players
USL League Two players
North American Soccer League players
United States men's youth international soccer players
United States men's under-20 international soccer players
United States men's under-23 international soccer players
FC Dallas draft picks
Soccer players from Florida
Association football midfielders
Association football defenders
USL League Two coaches